Elachista irenae is a moth of the family Elachistidae which can be found in Poland and Slovakia.

Adults are on wing from the second half of June to the end of July in one generation per year.

The larvae feed on Festuca versicolor. They mine the leaves of their host plant. They mine downwards, and usually start mining near the leaf tip. Pupation takes place on the ground or on a leaf of the food plant. Larvae can be found from May to the second half of June. The species overwinters as a young larva.

References

irenae
Moths described in 1989
Moths of Europe